Go Jung-nam (born 5 November 1975) is a South Korean fencer. She competed in the women's team épée event at the 2004 Summer Olympics.

References

1975 births
Living people
South Korean female épée fencers
Olympic fencers of South Korea
Fencers at the 2004 Summer Olympics